Te Rangitahau  (?–1900) was a notable New Zealand tribal leader, warrior. Of Māori descent, he identified with the Ngati Hineuru and Ngati Tuwharetoa iwi. He was born in Opepe, New Zealand.

References

1900 deaths
New Zealand military personnel
Ngāti Tūwharetoa people
Year of birth missing